Orromyces is a fungal genus in the family Gymnoascaceae. This is a monotypic genus, containing the single species Orromyces spiralis.

References

External links
 

Monotypic Eurotiomycetes genera
Onygenales
Taxa described in 1987